Rubus wheeleri is a North American species of bristleberry in section Setosi of the genus Rubus, a member of the rose family.

References

wheeleri
Plants described in 1932
Flora of Canada
Flora of the United States